Legislative elections were held 17 March 2010 to elect the 13th Norfolk Island Legislative Assembly. Counting was completed the next day.

Results

References

Norfolk
Elections in Norfolk Island